The 2020–21 Alaska Nanooks men's ice hockey season would have been the 72nd season of play for the program, the 37th at the Division I level and the 8th in the WCHA conference. The Nanooks represented the University of Alaska Fairbanks.

Season
Due to health concerns as a result of the ongoing COVID-19 pandemic, Alaska notified the WCHA on December 11, shortly before it was scheduled to begin its season, that the university had decided to suspend its program for the season. The NCAA had previously announced that all winter sports athletes would retain whatever eligibility they possessed through at least the following year. Less than a week after Alaska's announcement, the NCAA approved a change in its transfer regulations that would allow players to transfer and play immediately rather than having to sit out a season, as the rules previously required. Because of this, players who would have been members of Alaska for the 2021 season had a pathway to leave the program and immediately play for another university.

Departures

Recruiting

† played junior hockey or equivalent during 2020–21 season.

Roster
As of January 31, 2021.

Standings

Schedule and Results
Season Cancelled

References

2020-21
Alaska
Alaska
Alaska
Alaska
Alaska